Events in the year 2016 in Kyrgyzstan.

Incumbents
 President – Almazbek Atambayev 
 Prime Minister – Temir Sariyev (until April); Sooronbay Jeenbekov (from April)

Events
September 3–8: 2016 World Nomad Games in Cholpon-Ata, Kyrgyzstan.
December 11: Referendum on changing the Constitution of Kyrgyzstan.

Deaths

References 

 
2010s in Kyrgyzstan
Years of the 21st century in Kyrgyzstan
Kyrgyzstan
Kyrgyzstan